Ashley Opperman (born 13 January 1983 in Cape Town, Western Cape) is a South African football (soccer) defender who plays for Hanover Park of the National First Division.

He made his Premier Soccer League (PSL) debut with Ajax Cape Town as a teenager during the 2000–01 season before spending time on loan at First Division club Avendale Athletico. In 2005, he returned to the PSL with Moroka Swallows, then spent a season with Ikapa Sporting before joining Vasco da Gama, who released him following their promotion to the PSL. In September 2010 he signed for Hanover Park.

References

External links
 Profile at Moroka Swallows website

1983 births
Living people
Sportspeople from Cape Town
South African soccer players
Association football defenders
Cape Town Spurs F.C. players
Moroka Swallows F.C. players
Ikapa Sporting F.C. players
Hanover Park F.C. players